Phyllis Lindstrom, née Sutherland, portrayed by Cloris Leachman, is a fictional character on the television sitcom The Mary Tyler Moore Show and subsequent spin-off Phyllis.

The Mary Tyler Moore Show
Phyllis Lindstrom (born in 1931 in San Francisco) is Mary Richards' snobbish, self-absorbed and interfering friend/downstairs neighbor. She married dermatologist Dr. Lars Lindstrom in 1955; Phyllis frequently mentions and quotes Lars, but he is never seen on the show. The Lindstroms manage the large Minneapolis house in which they live, along with upstairs neighbor (and Mary's eventual close friend) Rhoda Morgenstern (Valerie Harper). Mary also develops a close relationship with Lindstrom daughter Bess (Lisa Gerritsen).

Rhoda and Phyllis maintain an adversarial but talkative relationship. In the series' first episode, Phyllis actively prevents Rhoda from claiming a newly vacated apartment so Mary can move in instead.

In season four opener "The Lars Affair", Phyllis clashes with the man-hungry hostess of WJM's Happy Homemaker show, Sue Ann Nivens (Betty White), following Sue Ann's affair with Lars. Phyllis and Sue Ann meet again in the episode "Phyllis Whips Inflation", Leachman's penultimate Mary Tyler Moore appearance. Colleagues attempt to prevent the pair from running into each other at the station; when they do, self-centered Phyllis plaintively asks Sue Ann if any jobs are available on her show.
 
Phyllis appears in one sixty minute episode "Rhoda's Wedding" (two parts in syndication) of the Mary Tyler Moore Show spinoff Rhoda. Phyllis (and Rhoda) later returned to Mary Tyler Moore for "The Last Show", the program's March 19, 1977 series finale. This is the character's only reappearance subsequent to the launch of the spinoff.

Phyllis

In 1975 Leachman left The Mary Tyler Moore Show to star in spin-off series Phyllis, in which Phyllis and Bess relocate to Phyllis' hometown San Francisco following the death of Lars.

They move in with Lars' mother Audrey (Jane Rose) and Audrey's new husband, Judge Jonathan Dexter (Henry Jones). Phyllis' major nemesis is Jonathan's sharp-tongued mother, Sally (Judith Lowry), an irritable, impatient woman known as "Mother Dexter". Mother Dexter gets along well with Bess.

Mary Tyler Moore appears as Mary Richards in two Phyllis episodes, once in the first season and then again in the second.

In the first season, Phyllis is employed at Erskine Photography Studio. In the second and final season, the series was retooled and Phyllis works as an administrative assistant for a city supervisor.

References

Television characters introduced in 1970
Fictional characters from Minnesota
Fictional characters from San Francisco
The Mary Tyler Moore Show characters